Social dialogue (or social concertation) is the process whereby social partners (trade unions and employer organisations) negotiate, often in collaboration with the government, to influence the arrangement and development of work-related issues, labour market policies, social protection, taxation or other economic policies. It is a widespread procedure to develop public policies in Western Europe in particular.

These can be direct relations between the social partners themselves ("bipartite") or relations between governmental authorities and the social partners ("tripartite"). To make it more clear, social dialogue can mean negotiation, consultation or simply an exchange of views between representatives of employers, workers and governments. It may consist of relations between labour and management, with or without direct government involvement. Social dialogue is a flexible tool that enables governments and employers’ and workers’ organizations to manage change and achieve economic and social goals.

Examples of social dialogue activity include mutual information, open discussion, concertation (on-going tripartite dialogue), exchanges of opinions, consultation and negotiation (agreements /common opinions).

European social dialogue is enshrined in the Treaty establishing the European Community (articles 138 and 139; ex 118a and 118b) and it is promoted by the European Commission as an instrument for a better governance and promotion of social and economic reforms.

Definition
According to the ILO’s definition, it means the practice of tripartism between governments and the representative organizations of workers and employers within and across borders are now more relevant to achieving solutions and to building up social cohesion and the rule of law through, among other means, international labor standards.

Purpose
The aim of social dialogue is to advance opportunities for women and men to obtain decent and productive work in conditions of freedom, equality, security and human dignity.

Enabling conditions
Social dialogue includes all types of negotiation, consultation and exchange of information between, or among, representatives of governments, employers and workers on issues of common interest

1. Respect for the fundamental rights of freedom of association and collective bargaining.

2. Strong, independent workers' and employers' organizations with the technical capacity and knowledge required to participate in social dialogue.

3. Political will and commitment to engage in social dialogue on the part of all parties.

4. Appropriate institutional support.

Means
1. Information sharing：

The inevitable foundation of effective social dialogue is to share information. Even if it doesn’t include discussion or real action, it still have its meaning.

2. Consultation：

Consultation exceeds information sharing, it needs exchanging perspective, opinion, ideas, and forms a deep conversation.

3. Negotiation/Conclude convention：

Some members need to be authorized to form the binding conventions.

4. Collective bargaining：

Collective bargaining is not only the inseparable form in social dialogue, but also be widely used. In every country, Collective      
bargaining is an indicator to identify the ability of social dialogue’s level.

The dilemma of pushing
Social dialogue faced challenge in some countries. Take Croatia for example, government and social partner couldn’t have consensus on adoption to overcome economic crisis in terms of public cost decrease and job saving through bargaining in several months.

The difference in nations
Social dialogue may take place at different levels and in various form, depending on national circumstances.

France

Social dialogue in France was hard to be national because of the political opposite in groups of social partner. Except for collective bargaining, it highlighted the discussion in tripartism on the issues of employment policy and human resource development. Employment committee in France proceeded consultation and participation of policy establishment on the issues of promoting employment and job training.

Germany

Because of the high coverage rate of unions and employers’ groups in Germany, and less of problems in political and ideological conflicts, social dialogue in national level elaborated higher influence on establishment of national policies. Except for job training and employment security, it also emphasized bargaining and negotiation in work conditions, including shortening of work hours and wage increase.

Austria, Denmark, Ireland and the Netherlands
When European Union (EU) suffered from the high rate of unemployment, there was brilliant performances in terms of macroeconomic development and employment rate in Austria, Denmark, Ireland and the Netherlands at the 1990s. Take 2001 for example, the unemployment rate of other 15 countries in EU was up to 7.4 percent. On the contrary, the unemployment rate of these four countries was merely 3.5 percent. ILO thought that the main reason of these four countries’ success was social dialogue, macroeconomic policies and labor market policies. For instance, the Wassenaar Agreement signed in the Netherlands in 1982, and Denmark advocated the national recovery program with Ireland in 1987. These agreements stood for the will of social partner to solve economic dilemma.

See also 
Intercultural dialogue

References

External links
Dialogue in Brief No. 1 November 2009
European Commission Employment, Social Affairs & Inclusion, Social dialogue
ILO's official website
ILO Declaration on Social Justice for a Fair Globalization

Labor relations